Mylothris schoutedeni is a butterfly in the family Pieridae. It is found in the Democratic Republic of the Congo. The habitat consists of forests.

References

Butterflies described in 1952
Pierini
Endemic fauna of the Democratic Republic of the Congo
Butterflies of Africa